Yuval Segal (born 6 December 1971) is an Israeli actor.

Biography

Personal life
Segal was born in Afula, Israel, to a Jewish family. During his childhood his family moved to Kfar Saba. In his youth, he competed in fencing. His grandfather, Eliezer Kagan, was a poet and a translator, and his aunt is the actress T'hia Danon. Segal is named after his uncle, corporal Yuval Shmueli, who died in the sinking of the INS Dakar Israeli Navy submarine.

Segal is married to Maya Yisraeli, and they have three children.

Career
In the middle of the 1990s, Segal started modeling for clothing companies, including Hamashbir Lazarchan. He also took part in many commercials. In 1996, he won the award for the model of the year.

In 1997, Segal began studying at the "Yoram Levinstein acting school". During his first year of study, he received his first television part in the series Deep Blue, which was broadcast on Channel 2. In 1998, he portrayed Dani Joani in a small part on the Channel 2 sitcom Shemesh. That year he also started acting on Tironut (Boot Camp) as Roei Mamman. Segal also appeared in many plays at Habima Theater and Beit Lessin Theater.

In 1999, he appeared in the film Zman Avir as Micha. One of his most significant roles was in Dover Kosashvili's 2003 drama film Matana MiShamayim, in which he starred as Vaja. His work in the film earned him an Ophir Award nomination for Best Actor.

In 2005, he starred as Yaki alongside Alon Abutbul in the film Lirkod (Dance). That same year he also began appearing in the sketch comedy series Ktsarim. In 2006, Segal portrayed Elisha Ben David in HOT's Parashat Hashavua. That year he also appeared on the sitcom Ha-Chaim Ze Lo Hacol as Ehud, a dance teacher.

From 2008, together with Keren Mor, he has led a commercial campaign for the credit card company Leumi Card; as of 2017, they both still ran the campaign.

In 2010, Segal starred as Yigal Levi in Taxi Driver, a comedy-drama tv series that he created and wrote. The series was broadcast on yes Drama, and due to the show's success, it was later broadcast on Channel 2. In 2014, he appeared as Doctor Gavish in the second season of the drama television series Yellow Peppers. Later that year he portrayed Boaz in the comedy-drama film Zero Motivation. In July 2014, he began portraying Professor Landau in Metim LeRega.

In 2015, he began playing the role of Moreno, a commander of a Mista'arvim unit, in yes's political thriller television series Fauda. Later that year, he also appeared in number of plays at the Beit Lessin Theater.

Selected filmography
 Zman Avir (1999)
 Matana MiShamayim (2003)
 Lirkod (2005)
 Zero Motivation (2014)
 The Other Story (2018)

Selected television
 Deep Blue (1997)
 Shemesh (1998)
 Tironut (1998)
 Ktsarim (2004–2009)
 Parashat Hashavua (2006–2009)
 Ha-Chaim Ze Lo Hacol (2005–2011) – Recurring character
 Taxi Driver (2010–2012)
 Yellow Peppers (2014)
 Metim LeRega (2014–2017)
 Fauda (2015–2017)

References

External links

 
 Profile on 'edb.co.il' 

1971 births
Living people
Israeli Jews
Israeli male film actors
Israeli male television actors
20th-century Israeli male actors
21st-century Israeli male actors
People from Northern District (Israel)
People from Kfar Saba